Butterfly 3000 is the eighteenth studio album by Australian psychedelic rock band King Gizzard & the Lizard Wizard, released on 11 June 2021. It is the band's first album not released on Flightless Records, instead being released on the band's own label KGLW. It is their second studio LP of 2021, following February's L.W.. The album was described as "melodic" and "psychedelic" upon its initial announcement on 10 May, along with the words "cross-eyed auto-stereogram", in reference to the album art.

Background and recording
On 19 March 2021, the band released one of the live performances from their recent tour as a bootleg album, titled Live in Melbourne '21, as well as their 13th Gizzymail newsletter. In the mail, there was a statement that read, "We've been having heaps of fun cooking up NEW STUFF in the studio. Can't wait to share new music with you." This suggested that the band had a new album in the works.

Recorded during the COVID-19 pandemic, the album's origins stem from recording instrumental interludes for their 2020 live album, Chunky Shrapnel: "We wrote a couple of song in major key vibes and we knew it wouldn't work on Chunky Shrapnel, which we were putting together. We had the song "Dreams", a synth pop thing that was clearly wrong for it. We just accidentally made this music that felt like it warranted its own project. And "Shanghai" came then "Black Hot Soup" and "Ya Love", and it felt like enough to hold a record and we should explore this concept super deeply." These early sessions were done as part of explorations for a follow-up to 2017's Polygondwanaland, before taking on an identity of its own.

Frontman Stu Mackenzie's daughter, Minty, was born during the recording process, influencing his worldview: "I definitely felt like I was in a cocoon before Minty was born. A butterfly is just a beautifully easy, metaphorical creature with this bizarre and interesting life cycle. That was the central motif for the whole record. And we tried to use it in every song."

On 11 May, the band revealed their next album: Butterfly 3000, due 11 June, and stated the album would have no singles leading to release. Matthew Ismael Ruiz of Pitchfork reported on the album with additional news from the band; "that it would have 10 tracks, that it was built around modular synth loops and the album art would be a 'cross-eyed autostereogram' by long-time collaborator Jason Galea."

The album was referred as "a suite of 10 songs" in the press release which suggested the songs were connected musically, and the final album's tracks all segue into another. The press release also described it as "[possibly] their most fearless leap into the unknown yet." Multiple articles breaking down the press release suggested the album would be a psychedelic, Animal Collective-style dream pop/neo-psychedelia record.

Release
On 10 June, the band announced a pre-order for 11 vinyl variants, each printed in a different language (the standard English variant, and the limited-edition Hindi, Dutch, French, German, Japanese, Mandarin, Russian, Spanish, Thai and Turkish variants). In addition, each individual record is a surprise color or "lucky dip of either Caterpillar Red Wax, Chrysalis Yellow Wax or Butterfly Blue Wax." The band released the album digitally on 11 June as planned in Australia, but put the album online for all other territories early through Bandcamp.

No information was revealed other than the aforementioned attributes and a 15-second snippet until its release, no singles were revealed, and unlike the band's last few albums, the album did not leak. In anticipation of the release, frontman Stu Mackenzie stated that it was his "favourite Gizzard album".

Music videos
On 12 June, the band announced that every song on the album would get a music video. The video for "Yours" was the first to be released, on 14 June. Directed by John Angus Stewart, the live-action video was shot in various locations and alternates between footage of the band members and the scenery. The video is preceded by a "photosensitive seizure warning". The video for "Shanghai" followed on 21 June, directed and animated by Amanda Bonaiuto. The videos for "Dreams" and "Blue Morpho" were released on 28 June and 6 July, respectively. Both videos were directed and animated by Jamie Wolfe, and feature the same animation style. Released on 12 July, the video for "Interior People" was written/directed by Ivan Dixon and produced/animated at Studio Showoff.

The live-action video for "Catching Smoke" was released on 26 July, and features the band members and additional dancers performing in suits and various intricate costumes. Stu Mackenzie is prominently featured, first appearing as a chrysalis/cocoon and ultimately transitioning into a butterfly, complete with large stylized wings and antennae. The video was written/directed by Danny Cohen and produced by both Cohen and Tessa Mansfield-Hung. The video for "2.02 Killer Year" was released on 2 August. Directed and designed by Sophie Koko, the video features 3D animation by Jack Wedge and Will Freudenheim. Released on 11 August, the video for "Black Hot Soup" was designed, directed and edited by Guy Tyzack. The video combines real footage and animation, as well as both digital and analog video processing techniques. The videos for "Ya Love" and "Butterfly 3000" were the final to be released, on 24 August and 31 August, respectively. Both videos were created by Jason Galea, but feature different visual styles. The video for "Butterfly 3000" is also preceded by a seizure warning.

Track listing
Vinyl releases have tracks 1–5 on Side A, and tracks 6–10 on Side B.

Personnel
King Gizzard & the Lizard Wizard 
 Stu Mackenzie – synthesiser; vocals (1-4, 6–10), Mellotron (1-4, 7, 10), acoustic guitar (1, 2, 4, 6, 8, 9), bass guitar (1-6, 8, 9), drums (1, 4, 6, 9, 10), piano (2, 6), Wurlitzer (4), percussion (6-8, 10)
 Joey Walker – acoustic guitar (5, 6), electric guitar (5, 6) vocals (5, 6), synthesiser (5, 6), keyboards (5), strings (6)
 Cook Craig – synthesiser (2, 6, 8-10), electric guitar (6, 8), percussion (8), Mellotron (9), bass guitar (9, 10)
 Michael Cavanagh – drums 
 Ambrose Kenny-Smith – percussion; vocals (1, 2, 6-9), harmonica (1), saxophone (4)

Production
 Stu Mackenzie – production, mixing 
 Joey Walker – mixing 
 Joseph Carra – mastering
 Jason Galea – artwork

Charts

Butterfly 3001 

On 7 December 2021, the band announced on their social media that they were releasing an album of remixes of songs from Butterfly 3000, titled Butterfly 3001, set to release on 21 January 2022. Alongside this announcement, they released two songs from the album - a dub remix of "Shanghai" by The Scientist, and remix titled "Neu Butterfly 3000" by Peaches. A month later, on 7 January 2022, they released the remix of "Black Hot Soup" by DJ Shadow, referred to as the "My Own Reality" Re-write, alongside a music video. On 21 January, the album released to Bandcamp and streaming platforms.

Track listing

Charts

References

2021 albums
King Gizzard & the Lizard Wizard albums
Dream pop albums by Australian artists
Synth-pop albums by Australian artists
Dance-pop albums by Australian artists
Art pop albums
Neo-psychedelia albums